The Crisis and Emergency Management Centre (CEMAC) is a Belgian center of excellence active in the domains of emergency planning, crisis management and crisis communications.  Its activities include research and development, consulting, training and information management.  CEMAC also covers the full cycle of crisis management: mitigation, planning, response, and recovery.

External links
CEMAC Home Page
Generic Belgian crisis management portal site

Emergency services